Zacalantica is a genus of very small sea snails or limpets, marine gastropod mollusks in the subfamily Phenacolepadinae  of the family Phenacolepadidae.

Species
 Zacalantica galathea (Lamarck, 1819)
 Zacalantica laevicostalis (Thiele, 1909)
 Zacalantica linguaviverrae (Melvill & Standen, 1899)
 Zacalantica sagittifer (A. Gould, 1852)
 Zacalantica senta (Hedley, 1899)
 Zacalantica tenuisculpta (Thiele, 1909)
 Zacalantica unguiformis (A. Gould, 1859)
Synonyms
 Zacalantica scobinata (A. Gould, 1859): synonym of Plesiothyreus scobinatus (A. Gould, 1859)

References

 Risbec J. (1942). Recherches anatomiques sur les Prosobranches de Nouvelle Calédonie (Troisième partie). Annales des Sciences Naturelles, Zoologie et Biologie Animale. ser. 11, 4: 21–41.

External links
 Iredale, T. (1929). Queensland molluscan notes, No. 1. Memoirs of the Queensland Museum. 9(3): 261-297, pls 30-31
 Fukumori H., Yahagi T., Warén A. & Kano Y. (2019). Amended generic classification of the marine gastropod family Phenacolepadidae: transitions from snails to limpets and shallow-water to deep-sea hydrothermal vents and cold seeps. Zoological Journal of the Linnean Society. 185(3): 636-655

Phenacolepadidae